Parka Posht-e Yavarzadeh (also Romanized as Parkā Posht-e Yāvarzādeh; also known as Parkabusht and Parkāposht) is a village in Kurka Rural District, in the Central District of Astaneh-ye Ashrafiyeh County, Gilan Province, Iran. At the 2006 census, its population was 688 in 189 families.

References 

Populated places in Astaneh-ye Ashrafiyeh County